Suzanne Williams is a politician in the U.S. state of Colorado. She is a Comanche; during her terms of office, she was the only enrolled American Indian state legislator in Colorado. She belongs to the Democratic Party.

Williams is related to J. Howard Williams, a former Texas president of the Southwestern Baptist Theological Seminary. Before running for office, she was a Special Education Professional in the Cherry Creek School District for 22 years.

In 2004 Williams was elected to the Colorado State Sentate. She served as assistant caucus chair for the Senate Majority Caucus, vice-chair on the Business, Labor and Technology Committee, and vice-chair of the Transportation Committee. As an American Indian, she was the only enrolled Native state legislator in Colorado.

On December 26, 2010, Williams was involved in a fatal car crash near Channing, Texas.  The car Williams was driving veered into oncoming traffic, killing Brianna Michelle Gomez.  Williams' son and two grandsons weren't wearing seatbelts and were hospitalized with injuries after being ejected from the vehicle. One of the injured grandchildren was not secured in a child seat as was required by law.  Williams faced a grand jury investigation; no criminal indictment was issued. She was later cited with three misdemeanor traffic violations. Williams faced significant criticism for the seat belt violations given her fervent advocacy for harsher seat belt violation penalties and her efforts to introduce legislation allowing police to pull over and ticket drivers should they suspect seat belts not in use. Subsequently, losing her expected promotion to Chairwoman of the Colorado State Senate Transportation Committee.

References

External links 
State of Colorado
Project Vote Smart

Living people
Colorado state senators
Members of the Colorado House of Representatives
Women state legislators in Colorado
21st-century American politicians
21st-century American women politicians
Year of birth missing (living people)